Danaway is a village near the A249 road and the M2 motorway, in the Swale district, in the English county of Kent. The nearest town is Sittingbourne. It is set in the base of a valley, with the oldest houses dating from the late 19th century.

References 
 A-Z Great Britain Road Atlas (page 40)

Borough of Swale
Villages in Kent